Royal Air Force Hurn or more simply RAF Hurn is a former Royal Air Force station located approximately  north west of Christchurch, Dorset, England

Opened in 1941, it was used by both the Royal Air Force and United States Army Air Forces. During the war it was used primarily as a transport and fighter airfield.

Hurn was the final airfield in England for aircraft flying to Morocco for the North African and Italian campaigns, avoiding France, Spain and Portugal airspace.

Since 1969, it has also been called Bournemouth Airport. The RAF have returned to Hurn in the form of a temporary Outsourcing Contract for Multi-Engine Pilot Training to cope with limited capacity through normal Training Provisions using L3 Harris Airline Academy (2018 -).

RAF use

The following squadrons were here at some point

Units:

USAAF use
Hurn was known as USAAF Station AAF-492 for security reasons by the USAAF during the war, and by which it was referred to instead of location.  Its USAAF Station Code was "KU".

422nd Night Fighter Squadron
On 28 June 1944, Northrop P-61 Black Widow night fighters of the 422nd Night Fighter Squadron arrived from RAF Scorton, where their crews had been tutored in this particular aspect of air combat by the RAF. The detachment commenced operational flying on 3 July only to return to Scorton a week later.

397th Bombardment Group
On 5 August the 397th Bombardment Group arrived from RAF Rivenhall, equipped with Martin B-26 Marauders.  The group consisted of the following operational squadrons:
 596th Bombardment Squadron (X2)
 597th Bombardment Squadron (9F)
 598th Bombardment Squadron (U2)
 599th Bombardment Squadron (6B)

The group's identification marking was a yellow diagonal band across both sides of the vertical tailplane. It moved the Advanced Landing Ground at Gorges, France, (A-26) on 19 August

The airfield was closed by the RAF in October 1944 and turned over for civil use.

See also

List of former Royal Air Force stations

References

 Freeman, Roger A. (1994) UK Airfields of the Ninth: Then and Now 1994. After the Battle 
 Freeman, Roger A. (1996) The Ninth Air Force in Colour: UK and the Continent-World War Two. After the Battle 

 Maurer, Maurer (1983). Air Force Combat Units Of World War II. Maxwell AFB, Alabama: Office of Air Force History. .
 ControlTowers.co.uk http://www.controltowers.co.uk/H-K/Hurn.htm
 USAAS-USAAC-USAAF-USAF Aircraft Serial Numbers--1908 to present

External links

 Photographs of Bournemouth International Airport from the Geograph British Isles project

Airfields of the 9th Bombardment Division in the United Kingdom
Royal Air Force stations in Dorset
Royal Air Force stations in Hampshire
Military units and formations established in 1941
Military units and formations disestablished in 1944